FK ŽAK Kikinda is a football club from Kikinda, Serbia which competes in the Vojvodina League East, Serbian fourth level of football competition. The club was founded in 1931. The club colors are blue and yellow. ŽAK means Železničarski atletski klub which translates in English to Railway Athletic Club.

History
ŽAK was founded in 1931.  ŽAK was one of the two representatives of the Novi Sad Football Subassociation in the 1935–36 Yugoslav Football Championship which was played in a cup format.  ŽAK was eliminated in the eighth finals by the other representative of the same subassociation, NAK Novi Sad, with a total score of 7–3, 0–4 at home and 3–3 as guests.

Recent results

Honours 
PFL Zrenjanin
2021–22 (champions)

Kikinda - Novi Bečej Municipal League
2013–14 (champions)

Rivalries
The main rival of FK ŽAK is their city rivals OFK Kikinda.

Famous players 
Played for the national team:
Stevan Veselinov
Mihalj Keri
Božidar Sandić

Supporters
ŽAK supporters are known as Žuti Mravi (Yellow Ants).

Stadium
Home games are played at the stadium of FK ŽAK, which is located in a part of town called Vašarište, and has a capacity for 2,000 spectators.

References

 ŽAK Kikinda on fkvojvodina.com 
 ŽAK Kikinda on Srbijasport.net

Football clubs in Serbia
Football clubs in Yugoslavia
Football clubs in Vojvodina
Sport in Kikinda
Association football clubs established in 1931